= Dispicable (EP) =

Dispicable EP

EP by LA Party Machine
- Released: June 02, 2015
- Recorded: 2014–15
- Genre: Hip hop; EDM
- Length: 25:28
- Label: LA Party Machine
- Producer: Snoop Dogg; Daz Dillinger; Trippy Keez

Dispicable EP is the debut EP by American EDM and hip hop project LA Party Machine (rapper-singer Snoop Dogg and rapper-record producer Daz Dillinger). The EP was released on June 2, 2015, via the iTunes Store and Apple Music.

== Production ==
Production for the album took place during 2014 to 2015 at several recording studios.

== Track listing ==
Dispicable EP — North American standard version
No.	Title	Length
1.	"I Know a Place" (featuring DJ Snoopadelic)	5:20
2.	"Work Me Out"	4:22
3.	"Put Your Hands Up" (featuring Tenah)	4:32
4.	"Pair of Dice" (featuring DJ Snoopadelic)	4:06
5.	"Fall in Luv" (featuring Shon Lawon)	3:40
6.	"Dispicable" (featuring DJ Snoopadelic)	4:08
Total length:		25:28

== Release history ==
Region	Date	Format	Label
Worldwide	June 2, 2015.	Digital download	LA Party Machine
